Mary Stuart Masterson (born June 28, 1966) is an American actress and film director. She has starred in the films At Close Range (1986), Some Kind of Wonderful (1987), Chances Are (1989), Fried Green Tomatoes (1991) and Benny & Joon (1993). She won the National Board of Review Award for Best Supporting Actress for her role in the 1989 film Immediate Family, and was nominated for the Tony Award for Best Featured Actress in a Musical for the 2003 Broadway revival of Nine.

Early life and education
Masterson was born June 28, 1966, in Manhattan (some sources cite Los Angeles, CA) the daughter of writer-director-actor-producer Peter Masterson and singer-actress Carlin Glynn. She has two siblings: Peter Jr., and Alexandra. As a teenager, she attended Stagedoor Manor Performing Arts Training Center in upstate New York with actors Robert Downey Jr. and Jon Cryer. Later, she attended schools in New York, including eight months studying anthropology at New York University.

Career
Masterson's first film appearance was in The Stepford Wives (1975) at the age of eight, playing a daughter to her real-life father. Rather than continue her career as a child actor, she chose to continue her studies, although she did appear in several productions at the Dalton School. In 1985, she returned to cinema in Heaven Help Us as Danni, a courageous teen running the soda shop of her gravely depressed father. She appeared with Sean Penn and Christopher Walken in the film At Close Range (1986) as Brad Jr's girlfriend Terry, a film based on an actual rural Pennsylvania crime family led by Bruce Johnston, Sr. during the 1960s and 1970s. She later starred as the tomboyish drummer Watts in the teenage drama Some Kind of Wonderful (1987). As a result, she is loosely connected with the Brat Pack. The same year Francis Ford Coppola cast her in Gardens of Stone in which she acted with her parents who were hired by Coppola to play her on-screen parents. In 1989, she played in Chances Are alongside Cybill Shepherd, Ryan O'Neal and Robert Downey Jr., and she starred as Lucy Moore, a teenage girl giving up her first baby to a wealthy couple, played by Glenn Close and James Woods in Immediate Family. For her work in that film she received a "Best Supporting Actress" award from the National Board of Review of Motion Pictures.

1990s
Masterson continued acting in films and television during the 1990s. In 1991, she starred in Fried Green Tomatoes, a film based on the novel Fried Green Tomatoes at the Whistle Stop Cafe. The film was well-received, with film critic Roger Ebert applauding Masterson's work. The following year she was invited to host Saturday Night Live. In 1993, she played opposite Johnny Depp in Benny & Joon as Joon, his mentally ill love interest. In 1994, she acted in Bad Girls, playing Anita Crown, a former prostitute, who joins with three other former prostitutes (played by Madeleine Stowe, Andie MacDowell and Drew Barrymore) in traveling the Old West. In 1996, Masterson acted alongside Christian Slater in the romantic drama Bed of Roses.

2000s
Although Masterson carried on her work in the film industry, by 2000 she had made a move towards television. In 2001, she produced her own television series, Kate Brasher, which was canceled by CBS after six episodes. In 2004, Masterson played Dr. Helen Taussig in the Emmy and Peabody Award-winning HBO biographical drama Something the Lord Made. Between 2004 and 2007, she made five guest starring appearances on Law & Order: Special Victims Unit as Dr. Rebecca Hendrix. A decade later, she appeared in a recurring role as FBI director Eleanor Hirst in the second and third seasons of Blindspot.

Masterson has appeared in Broadway theater productions, and was nominated for a 2003 Tony Award as "Best Featured Actress in a Musical" in the Maury Yeston musical Nine: The Musical, directed by David Leveaux.

Masterson has narrated several audiobooks, including I See You Everywhere by Julia Glass, Book of the Dead by Patricia Cornwell, The Quickie by James Patterson and Look Again by Lisa Scottoline.

Directing
In May 1993, Masterson revealed she had written a screenplay for a film tentatively entitled Around the Block, a romantic comedy about a "woman who conquers her fears by becoming a singer"; in a cover story about Benny & Joons box office success, she told Entertainment Weekly she was going to direct it herself, with principal photography expected that autumn.

In 2001, she began her directing career with a segment titled "The Other Side" in the television movie On the Edge.

Masterson made her feature film directorial debut in 2007, with The Cake Eaters, which premiered at the Ft. Lauderdale International Film Festival as well as the Ashland Independent Film Festival where it received the 'Audience Award – Dramatic Feature' prize in 2008. Of her move to directing, Masterson said in an interview, "When I signed to do this, I wasn't scared but, yes, it was scary. I'm already 40, although we don't want to talk about that. In '92, I wrote my first screenplay, which I then was to direct, but I ended up taking an acting job because it takes forever to get a movie made."

Personal life
Masterson was married to George Carl Francisco from 1990 to 1992 and to filmmaker Damon Santostefano from 2000 to 2004. In 2006, Masterson married actor Jeremy Davidson after they starred together in the 2004 stage production of Cat on a Hot Tin Roof. In October 2009, Masterson gave birth to their first child, son Phineas Bee. She gave birth to twins in August 2011, son Wilder and daughter Clio.

Filmography

Film

As director

Television

Awards and nominations
Ashland Independent Film Festival
2008: Won, "Best Dramatic Feature" – The Cake Eaters

DVD Exclusive Awards
2001: Nominated, "Best Actress" – The Book of Stars

Ft. Lauderdale International Film Festival
2007: Won, "Best American Indie" – The Cake Eaters

Lone Star Film & Television Awards
1997: Won, "Best TV Actress" – Lily Dale

MTV Movie Awards
1994: Nominated, "Best On-Screen Duo" – Benny and Joon (shared w/Johnny Depp)

National Board of Review of Motion Pictures
1989: Won, "Best Supporting Actress" – Immediate Family

Satellite Awards
2005: Nominated, "Best Actress in a Supporting Role in a Series, Mini-Series or Motion Picture Made for Television" – Something the Lord Made

References

External links

 
 
 
 

1966 births
Actresses from New York City
American child actresses
American film actresses
Film producers from New York (state)
American musical theatre actresses
American television actresses
American women film directors
Dalton School alumni
Living people
New York University alumni
People from Manhattan
Film directors from New York City
American women film producers
Theatre World Award winners
20th-century American actresses
21st-century American actresses